Naujienos is the title of two Lithuanian-language newspapers:

Naujienos (apolitical newspaper), monthly published in 1901–1903 by Varpas editorial staff in East Prussia
Naujienos (socialist newspaper), daily published in 1914–1980s by Lithuanian-Americans in Chicago